USS Pittsburgh (LPD-31), a Flight 2  for the United States Navy, will be the fifth United States Navy vessel named after Pittsburgh. Secretary of the Navy Kenneth Braithwaite officially announced multiple ship names, including Pittsburgh, during his visit to the oldest U.S. Navy commissioned ship afloat, on 15 January 2021.

References
 

 

San Antonio-class amphibious transport docks
Submarines of the United States Navy
Proposed ships of the United States Navy